Sports psychiatry is a medical specialty that aims to treat and prevent mental disorders in athletes and helps them use different techniques to enhance their performance. First mentioned in literature in 1967, it is a developing area that relies on other fields, like sports psychology.

History 
The first publication on sports psychiatry was written in 1967 by Arnold R Beisser, a doctor and tennis player. It was brought up in literature again twenty years later by JH Rick Massimino, MD, and mentioned again in 1992 by California-based psychiatrist Daniel Begel, who is known for officially launching the specialty. As the field developed, the World Psychiatric Association eventually created a section on Exercise and Sports Psychiatry, giving way for interest in other countries, including Britain and Germany.

International Society for Sports Psychiatry 
In 1994, Begel founded the International Society for Sports Psychiatry (ISSP). The organization aims to spread the benefits of the field to the entire athletic community and promote mental health in sports. ISSP membership in 2020 is open to medical students, residents, psychiatrists, and other clinicians at times.

Requirements 
The requirements to be a sports psychiatrist as of 2018 are the same as for any psychiatrist. However, in addition to that, they must be aware of individual and team culture as well as approach the prescription of medication with a perspective on doping in sports.

Professional differences 
Differences between sports psychologists and psychiatrists, according to Antonia Baum, are that although both areas aim to enhance athletes' performance, psychiatry also focuses on psychopathology and tries to uncover deeper issues than performance problems. Additionally, psychiatrists are able to prescribe psychotropic medication.

Common areas of study 
Some of the most commonly found mental disorders in athletes that sports psychiatrists may come in contact with include mood disorders (such as major depressive disorder, bipolar disorder), anxiety disorders (including social anxiety disorder, obsessive-compulsive disorder, eating disorders, attention deficit hyperactivity disorder (ADHD), and substance abuse), and more sport-specific ones such as concussions, body dysmorphic disorder, traumatic brain injuries (TBI), and chronic traumatic encephalopathy (CTE).

Eating and body dysmorphic disorders have higher incidence in women in sports that emphasize appearance, like gymnastics or figure skating. Substance abuse is commonly found in the athletic community. College athletes have been reported to use alcohol at higher levels than the general public despite its detriment to performance. Anabolic steroids are also a widely abused substance among athletes. These aid athletes in faster training and recovery time, but may also have psychiatric side effects like irritability and mood swings. Substance abuse is a concern among elite athletes.

Commonly used techniques 
The treatments of choice for many mental illnesses experienced by athletes include psychotropic medication as well as, depending on the specific situation and life of the athlete, psychotherapy, psychoeducation, counseling, and family therapy.

Psychotropic medication 
Usually, sports psychiatrists choose non-sedating medications because they are less likely to cause side effects such as an increase in weight and body fat, sedentary behavior, a decrease in insulin sensitivity, cardiac issues. The effect on athletes' performance must also be taken into consideration, as well the anti-doping guidelines of different sports leagues. The World Anti-Doping Agency (WADA) provides a list of generally banned substances, and it is left to each leagues' discretion to add a more strict code.

Widely used medications include antidepressants (e.g. bupropion), mood stabilizers, anticonvulsants (e.g. lithium), anxiolytics (e.g. benzodiazepines), Psychostimulants/ADHD medications (e.g. dextroamphetamine), and sometimes sedative hypnotics and antipsychotics.

Mental health stigma 
In professional sports more than others, seeking assistance to improve one's mental health is often stigmatized. Athletes will most commonly seek help from psychologists first or not go for help at all, and serious mental health-related issues might go unrecognized. Hence, another role of sports psychiatrists is to help de-stigmatize and promote mental health among athletes.

See also 
 Sports medicine

References

Further reading 

 

psychiatry
Psychiatric specialities